Go North West is a bus operator in Greater Manchester, England. It is a subsidiary of the Go-Ahead Group.

History
Go North West commenced operations on 2 June 2019 following the Go-Ahead Group's purchase of First Greater Manchester's Queens Road depot with 163 vehicles.

In December 2022, the Greater Manchester Combined Authority announced that Go North West had won the first round of franchising to run the first Bee Network bus services in Bolton and Wigan from September 2023, displacing the operations of Diamond North West and Stagecoach Manchester in both towns. Go North West will take delivery of 50 Bee Network branded Alexander Dennis Enviro400EV battery electric buses for use on these services.

Services
Go North West operate 25 public services and six school services from the Queens Road depot as of September 2021. It largely serves suburban areas in the north of Manchester along with Salford and Bury.

Certain routes have been specifically branded by the company. The 52 and the 53, the latter being Manchester's oldest unchanged bus route, are branded with an orange livery as the 'Manchester's Orbits', while the 135 route has received a similar green livery, both based on the standard fleet livery. In 2021, the CrossCity brand was launched on the 41 service serving Sale and Middleton via the city centre.

Fleet

As of October 2022, Go North West operates 180 buses, a large amount of which were initially acquired from First Greater Manchester. Buses were initially painted into a livery designed by local marketing agency We Are Buzz, however the livery was redesigned in late 2019. This redesign later coincided with the introduction of the Manchester's Orbits and 135 branding.

Buses are based at the former First depot in Queen's Road, Cheetham Hill, opened in 1901 by the Manchester Carriage and Tramways Company as the first electric tram depot to open in Manchester. The depot premises is adjacent to the Museum of Transport in Manchester. Following the acquisition of the garage in 2019, Go North West had the depot's original clock restored to working order and also funded an auction bid to help return the golden key used to first open the garage to the adjacent museum.

Controversies

2021 strike action

On 28 February 2021, a strike was called by the union Unite over concerns that the new payment package was a 'fire and re-hire' scheme, following Go North West making a loss of £1.8 million per year. A reduced service operated during the period of industrial action, with the company hiring other local operators to maintain services, some of which were criticised by Unite for overcrowding buses during the third COVID-19 lockdown. The strike ended on 18 May 2021 after successful talks between both parties in Unite's favour. Lasting 85 days, Unite claims this to have been their longest period of strike action.

Dismissal of Tracey Scholes
In December 2021, driver Tracey Scholes was dismissed after 34 years of service due to new side mirrors on the fleet being phased in to replace "branch" mirrors following consultation with the union Unite. An unforeseen consequence of this was that Scholes could not operate the vehicle safely, being too short to use them as the same time as driving the bus.

A Go North West spokesperson said Scholes was a valued member of the team and they had made "numerous proposals to accommodate" Scholes, but the suggestions were rejected.

Scholes had been the first female bus driver for a Manchester depot, starting work at Queens Road in 1984. A rally in support of Scholes was held outside of the Queens Road depot while a petition demanding Go North West reinstate Scholes reached 25,000 signatures, and following a final appeal in January 2022, Scholes' position at Go North West was reinstated.

References

External links

Bus operators in Greater Manchester
Go-Ahead Group companies
Transport companies established in 2019
2019 establishments in England